Alberto Desiserio (born 26 March 1973) is a former Italian javelin thrower.

His personal bests, 80.80 m set in 2001, at the end of the 2020 outdoor season is still the 5th best all-time performance of the Italian lists and in that year it was also the 46th best result in the world top-lists.

National titles
Desiserio won six national championships at individual senior level.

Italian Athletics Championships
Javelin throw: 2001 (1)
Italian Winter Throwing Championships
Javelin throw: 1997, 1999, 2001, 2002, 2003 (5)

See also
 Italian all-time top lists - Javelin throw

References

External links
 

1973 births
Living people
Italian male javelin throwers
Athletics competitors of Fiamme Gialle
Sportspeople from Catania